"Send It On" is a song by American R&B recording artist D'Angelo. It was released by Virgin Records on March 25, 2000, as a radio single in promotion of D'Angelo's second studio album Voodoo (2000). He wrote the song, with his brother Luther Archer and R&B singer Angie Stone, in 1998 at a recording studio in Virginia after the birth of his son. It was produced by D'Angelo at Electric Lady Studios in New York City. 

As Voodoos fourth single, "Send It On" peaked at number 33 on the Billboard R&B singles chart. The music video for the song featured footage from the album's supporting tour, "The Voodoo Tour".

Background 
Following the birth of his son, D'Angelo composed Voodoos first song, "Send It On", in 1998 at a recording studio in Virginia, which started the album's recording. The song was produced by D'Angelo at Electric Lady Studios in New York City. Official credits for "Send It On" were attributed to R&B singer Angie Stone and D'Angelo's brother Luther Archer.

Music and lyrics 
The song is about honesty and faith in love, and features classic soul arrangements with trumpeter Roy Hargrove playing flugel horn. It features an interpolation of Kool & the Gang's "Sea of Tranquility" (1969). The song also has an arrangement of live guitar, bass and kick-drum, while D'Angelo's falsetto vocals contain spiritual highs and soulful lows. Mark Anthony Neal of PopMatters wrote that the song "evokes the late '70s sounds of Angela Bofill ('I Try')." Another critic described the song's horn-driven sound as reminiscent of the work of Sam Cooke. 

On D'Angelo's vocal style on "Send It On", a Billboard magazine reviewer stated "In this musical setting, he sounds less like Prince (as he did on 'Untitled') and more like he's developing his own unique style-which bears the undeniable influence of Prince, Al Green, and Otis Redding." Entertainment Weeklys Matt Diehl called the song a "stately soul ballad like they just don't make anymore".

Track listing
CD Maxi single

"Send It On" (Radio Edit) – 4:39 
"Send It On" (Album Version) – 5:56 
"Send It On" (Call Out Hook) – 0:12

Personnel
Credits adapted from album booklet liner notes.

 Produced by D'Angelo 
 All vocals performed by D'Angelo 
 Vocal and musical arrangements by D'Angelo 
 Guitar: C. Edward Alford 
 Bass: Pino Palladino 
 Drums: Ahmir Thompson 
 Flugel horn and Trumpet: Roy Hargrove 
 All other instruments: D'Angelo

Chart performance

Notes

References

External links
 Music video at Yahoo! Music

2000 singles
D'Angelo songs
1998 songs
Songs written by Angie Stone
Songs written by D'Angelo
Virgin Records singles
EMI Records singles
Soul ballads
1990s ballads